Jordan Robert Romano (born April 21, 1993) is a Canadian professional baseball pitcher for the Toronto Blue Jays of Major League Baseball (MLB).

High school and college
Romano attended Father Michael McGivney Catholic Academy in his home town of Markham, Ontario. A standout athlete, he excelled in baseball, basketball, soccer, and volleyball.  Undrafted out of high school, he then attended Connors State College. In his first season for Connors State, Romano pitched to a 0–1 win–loss record, 8.68 earned run average (ERA), and 14 strikeouts in 9 innings. The following season, Romano made 10 starts and posted a 4–3 record with a 4.74 ERA and 53 strikeouts in 38 innings pitched, helping get the Cowboys to the National Junior College Athletic Association (NJCAA) World Series. After the season, Romano transferred to Oral Roberts University, where he played one season for the Golden Eagles. Pitching as the team's closer, Romano made 29 relief appearances and posted a 3–4 record, 11 saves, 2.66 ERA, and 49 strikeouts in 40 innings.

Professional career
Romano was selected in the tenth round of the 2014 Major League Baseball draft by the Toronto Blue Jays. He received a $25,000 signing bonus and was assigned to the Rookie-level Gulf Coast League Blue Jays. After making two appearances, he was promoted to the Bluefield Blue Jays of the Rookie-Advanced Appalachian League, where he finished the 2014 season. In 13 total appearances, Romano posted a 1–1 record, 1.93 ERA, and 34 strikeouts in 28 innings pitched. During spring training for the 2015 season, Romano tore his ulnar collateral ligament, and in April he underwent Tommy John surgery. Due to the procedure, he missed the entire 2015 minor league season. Romano was assigned to the Lansing Lugnuts of the Class-A Midwest League at the start of the 2016 season, and was activated off the disabled list on June 13, 2016, to make the first start of his professional career. In the start, he held the Great Lakes Loons to two hits while striking out seven in a 4–1 complete game win. Romano finished the 2016 season with a 3–2 record, 2.11 ERA, and 72 strikeouts in 72 innings pitched. He spent the entire 2017 minor league season with the Dunedin Blue Jays of the Advanced-A Florida State League, and pitched to a 7–5 record, 3.39 ERA, and 138 strikeouts in 138 innings.

In 2018, the Blue Jays invited Romano to spring training. He began the season with the New Hampshire Fisher Cats of the Double-A Eastern League. On May 16, Romano pitched six no-hit inning against the Hartford Yard Goats, and became the first pitcher in the minors to reach seven wins. After reaching an 8–0 record with a 2.04 ERA, Romano was promoted to the Triple-A Buffalo Bisons on May 27.

On December 13, 2018, Romano was taken third overall in the Rule 5 draft by the Chicago White Sox and was immediately traded to the Texas Rangers for cash considerations. On March 24, 2019, he was returned to the Blue Jays.

He opened the 2019 season back with Buffalo. On June 12, his contract was selected and he was called up to the major leagues for the first time. He made his major league debut that night, pitching a scoreless 7th inning in an 8–6 victory over the Baltimore Orioles and collecting his first major league strikeout against Pedro Severino.

On July 24, 2020, Romano earned his first MLB win. On August 21, 2020, he earned his first MLB save. With the 2020 Toronto Blue Jays, Romano appeared in 15 games, compiling a 2-1 record with 1.23 ERA and 21 strikeouts in 14.2 innings pitched.

In 2021, Romano became the Blue Jays closer and went 7-1 with a 2.14 ERA in 63 innings, compiling 23 saves.

On April 11, 2022, Romano set a Blue Jays club record with his 26th consecutive converted save stretching back to the 2021 season, in helping the team to a 3-0 victory over the New York Yankees.

On July 17, 2022, it was announced that Romano was selected to the American League All-Star team, his first ever selection.

In 2022, Romano finished 3rd in the American League with 36 saves, striking out 73 batters in 64 innings with a 2.11 ERA. He was charged with the blown save and loss in the Blue Jays Wild Card Game 2 defeat giving up 2 runs. 

On January 13, 2023, Romano signed a one-year, $4.5375 million contract with the Blue Jays, avoiding salary arbitration.

International baseball
In February 2017, it was announced that Romano would play for Team Italy at the 2017 World Baseball Classic.

See also
Rule 5 draft results

References

External links

1993 births
Living people
American League All-Stars
Baseball people from Ontario
Bluefield Blue Jays players
Buffalo Bisons (minor league) players
Canadian expatriate baseball players in the United States
Canadian people of Italian descent
Connors State Cowboys baseball players
Dunedin Blue Jays players
Gulf Coast Blue Jays players
National baseball team players
Lansing Lugnuts players
Major League Baseball pitchers
Major League Baseball players from Canada
New Hampshire Fisher Cats players
Oral Roberts Golden Eagles baseball players
Sportspeople from Markham, Ontario
Toronto Blue Jays players
2017 World Baseball Classic players